French Empire may refer to: 

 First French Empire, ruled by Napoleon I from 1804 to 1814 and in 1815 and by Napoleon II in 1815, the French state from 1804 to 1814 and in 1815
 Second French Empire, led by Napoleon III, the French state from 1852 to 1870
 French colonial empire, the territories administered by France from the 16th century to the mid-20th century